The Bearkat Softball Complex is the home stadium for the Division I (NCAA) Sam Houston State Bearkats softball team. Located next to the Bowers Stadium on the campus of Sam Houston State University, the stadium features seating for 400 fans.  Included in the 400 seat capacity is a combination of partially covered chair back and bleacher seats.  The stadium has field lighting, bullpens, dugouts, a press box, enclosed hitting area, and an electronic scoreboard.  Also included is coaches offices, locker rooms' training rooms' concessions, a conference room, and restrooms.

The initial home game was played in February, 2006.

The 2007 and 2011 Southland Conference softball tournaments were held at the Bearkat Softball Complex. In 2007, they won conference which allowed them to go to the Division I Women's College World Series, the first time in school history. During their first decade at the facility, the Bearkats have a record of 134-79. The stadium can be rented for $1,500 for day games, $1,700 for night games and $2,000 for double-headers.

Yearly attendance 

Below is a yearly summary of the Bearkat Softball Complex attendance.

As of the 2013–14 season.

References

External links
 Sam Houston State Bearkats Softball Official Website
 Bearkat Softball Complex Facilities Webpage

Sam Houston Bearkats softball
College softball venues in the United States
Softball venues in Texas
Sports venues completed in 2006
2006 establishments in Texas